The Thai League 3 Play-off Round is the last promotion quota of Thai League 2 and determines which club will be the champion of 2018 Thai League 3. The Thai Football clubs that are the champion and runner-up of the 2018 Thai League 3 Upper Region and the champion and the runner-up of the 2018 Thai League 3 Lower Region, compete in the 2018 Thai League 3 Play-off Round. In this round, home and away matches are played against each team, and the   clubs that get the highest total scores are promoted to Thai League 2. The away goals rule is used in this tournament.

3rd Position of Play-off round

|-
|}

1st Position of Play-off round

|-
|}

Winner

References

 Official T3 Play-off rule

External links
 official web of T3 Play-off round

Thai League 3
2018 in Thai football leagues